Anjali Chadha (born 2000s) is an American bioengineer. She is an ambassador for AAAS If/Then. She was named a 2020 Voices Of the Year, by Seventeen magazine.

Life 
She grew up in Louisville. She studied at DuPont Manual high school, and Massachusetts Institute of Technology. She founded Empowered, Inc. in 2016 In 2018, she was featured in the documentary, Science Fair. In May of 2018, Chadha won two prizes at the Intel International Science and Engineering Fair (Intel ISEF). She won the Environmental Engineering Intel ISEF Second Award and the Special Award: Air Force Research Laboratory on behalf of the United States Air Force First Award, winning $1500 and $750 respectively. She was also a member of the Center for Excellence in Education's 2018 Research Science Institute cohort. In 2019, she was one of 40 finalists for the Regeneron Science Talent Search (STS) for her invention of a sensor that could detect arsenic in drinking water from underground sources and received a $25,000 prize.

Chadha was featured on an episode of Mission Unstoppable that aired on June 12, 2021.

References

External links 
 Official Website of Chadha's nonprofit Empowered, Inc.

Living people
American bioengineers
Massachusetts Institute of Technology alumni
DuPont Manual High School alumni
Year of birth missing (living people)
People from Louisville, Kentucky
Women bioengineers